Broad Creek Memorial Scout Reservation, more commonly called just Broad Creek, is the sum of eight separate areas in the Chesapeake Bay Watershed. During the summer Camp Saffran focuses on older youth while Camp Spencer focuses on younger youth. Camp Oest was focused on younger youth, but that operation moved to Camp Spencer in 2016. Camp Oest is now used for large events, such as Woodbadge and NYLT. During the off-season Camp Oest, Camp Saffran, and Camp Spencer are open for weekend tent and cabin camping. Five other less developed areas of the reservation used for outpost camping and hiking are called Camp Cone, Camp Finney, The Pines, The Hemlocks, and OA Hill. The facilities at the reservation are used by 36,000 youth each year, 17% of whom are not affiliated with the Boy Scouts of America.

History 

The  Lake Straus was formed in the 1940s when Susquehanna River tributary Broad Creek was dammed. Later Saffran, Oest, and Spencer each built piers to access Lake Straus. Spencer also has an additional pier upstream from Lake Straus. In 1948 an administration building was added in Camp Saffran. In July 1953 Post 716 of the Saint Elizabeth Catholic War Veterans contributed to the Broad Creek Memorial Camp Fund. Canoe trips for older Boy Scouts began May 1954. In 1967 the Seabees built a bridge across the dam at the reservation. Camp Spencer was closed after the summer of 2012. Spencer reopened in 2015 as a specialty resident STEM camp. That program moved to Camp Saffran just before the summer of 2017. In 2016 and 2017 Camp Spencer hosted a resident camp for the youngest youth called Cub Camp at Broad Creek.

Hemlocks 
The easternmost substantial hemlock forest in Maryland, home to the smokey shrew, is a  old-growth hemlock forest that is located on both The Hemlocks area of the reservation and Conowingo Dam property. The invasive species hemlock woolly adelgid threatened the forest. In 2006 area volunteers worked with state officials to study and reduce the destruction caused by the hemlock woolly adelgid. Since 2007 area youth volunteers continue to record data, and mark trees. Trained adult volunteers inject imidacloprid into soil. Trees too close to streams and wetlands to receive soil injections instead receive trunk imidacloprid injections from Maryland department of agriculture staff. As a biocontrol remedy the Forest Service released over 2,300 Laricobius beetles into the forest. In 2013 the Forest Service reported that the "Laricobius beetles are spreading, the hemlock woolly adelgid is less prevalent, and the condition of the hemlock forest has noticeably improved."

Camp Cone 
An area of the camp is named after the Baltimore Area Council's former Camp Cone. The camp was purchased in the 1940s.

The property is located near Glen Arm, Maryland and is part of the Gunpowder Falls State Park.

Land patent 
In 1632 Charles I of England granted Cecil Calvert, 2nd Baron Baltimore the land that is now Maryland in a charter. That charter land was divided by land patents. By 2012 almost all land in Maryland had been so divided. Land surveyor Frank S. Richardson found that  used by the reservation to provide universal access was not a part of any existing patent. The Baltimore Area Council applied for a land patent to resolve the issue.

Camp Saffran

Programs 
Camp Saffran currently focuses on older youth that are a part of either or both the Boy Scout or Venturing programs. Available programs include: aqua trek (kayaking, canoeing, and sailing on the Susquehanna River), all-terrain vehicle program, Broad Creek Exploration Trek (canoeing, backpacking, Outdoor Code training, and Leave No Trace training), BSA aquatics supervision, basketball, conservation, cooking, climbing, eagle summit program (Eagle Scout required merit badges), ecology, explorer's trek, family night,  first year camper, fishing, fourth year or more, handicraft, merit badge counseling, mile swim, motor tubing, night swim, opening campfire, patrol award, polar bear swim, quarter-mile swim, recognition campfire, Scoutcraft, second year camper, STEM Nova program, shooting sports, stand-up paddleboarding, themed camp-wide games, third year camper, tubing, trailblazers, volleyball, and wilderness survival.

Facilities 
Campsites have canvas wall tents, each with two cots. Each campsite has picnic tables, a bulletin board, a flagpole, and a group shelter. Some campsites have cabins equipped with a full kitchen that includes a stove, hot water, fridge, and electricity. Some campsites have a pavilion and an Adirondack shelter with a cooking space and electricity. Site Conowingo can support 24 people and includes a lodge and trailer pad. Site Dan Beard can support 40 people and includes a lodge and trailer pad. Site Flint Ridge can support 60 people and includes a lodge and trailer pad. Site Friar Tuck can support 16 people and includes an Adirondack shelter and trailer pad. Site Frontier can support 24 people and includes a lodge. Site Hawkeye can support 28 people and includes an Adirondack shelter and trailer pad. Site Jamestown can support 24 people and includes an Adirondack shelter and trailer pad. Site Lookout can support 30 people and includes a lodge and trailer pad. Site Prospect can support 40 people and includes a lodge and trailer pad. Site Susquehanna can support 40 people and includes a lodge and trailer pad. Site Timberline can support 24 people and includes an Adirondack shelter and trailer pad. The camp also offers a 30-foot outdoor screen, often used for movies.

While the Nentico Pavilion dining hall serves cafeteria style meals, Saffran also offers groups the option to prepare food from their own supplies at a reduced fee. Other facilities include: archery range, bridge, camp staff areas, dam, family cabin area, filtration houses, Jacobs Health Lodge, parade ground,  pump stations, ranger's house, rifle range, Rosenberg Welcome Center, shop, skeet range, stock control area, trading post, trap range, and water towers.

Camp Spencer

Programs 
Camp Spencer currently runs the Cub Camp at Broad Creek that focuses on younger youth. Programs include: aquanaut, archery, BB gun, climbing wall, closing party with songfest, gaga ball, geology, nature, obstacle course, opening campfire, paddling, pool luau, rowing, Scoutcraft, slingshots, s’mores fire, staff hunt, STEAM discovery, swimming, team building, water games, and wildlife. Project Moving Onward & Outward Scouting Experience or M.O.O.S.E. is a hike or canoe trip to an outpost where participants spend the night after a campfire with  singing, s’mores, and ceremony. Adult training programs available include: Basic Adult Leader Outdoor Orientation (BALOO), Cubmaster Leader Specifics, Religious Awards Awareness, Safe Swim Defense, Safety Afloat, This is Scouting, and Youth Protection.

Facilities 
Shower houses has individual shower stalls, flush toilets and hot water. Each campsite includes a latrine with running water. Other facilities include: archery range, chapel, rifle range, Olympic-size swimming pool. The administration building offers both administrative and first aid staff. The trading post offers: branded apparel, camping supplies, candy, craft supplies, embroidered patches, Scouting literature, Scouting supplies including a quite diverse selection of pocket knives, snacks, and sodas.

Events

In addition to summer camps and weekend camping, the reservation hosts other Scouting events. In 1980 record executive Kevin Liles spent a weekend in the wilderness area of the reservation with "a compass, a Swiss Army Knife, some matches and the clothes on our backs" to complete part of wilderness survival merit badge. In July 1986 the reservation hosted the Pennsylvania State University Science and Energy Specialty Camp. The camp hosted the Quantico Orienteering Club's 2003 Maryland Scout Orienteering Day. On April 30, 2010 the reservation hosted the Harford County Astronomical Society Broad Creek Boy Scout Program.

The reservation also hosts "non-boy Scout groups including schools, governments, community, church groups and other non-profit organizations including Girl Scouts, Boys and Girls Clubs, Cal Ripkin Foundation, Royal Rangers, NAACP youth program, Maryland DNR and Harford County High Schools." In July 1997 the camp hosted the United States Army Research Laboratory Extended Use of Night Vision Goggles: An Evaluation of Comfort for Monocular and Biocular Configurations. The reservation routinely hosts Harford County Sheriff's Office training exercises. Camp Finney features the Harford County Sheriff's Office Rifle Range and K-9 training course.

See also

 Scouting in Delaware
 Scouting in Maryland
 Scouting in New Jersey
 Scouting in Pennsylvania

References

Northeast Region (Boy Scouts of America)
Summer camps in Maryland
Buildings and structures in Harford County, Maryland
1948 establishments in Maryland
Youth organizations based in Maryland
Youth organizations established in 1948